The 2010–11 MTN40 was a domestic one-day cricket championship in South Africa. It was the 30th time the championship was contested. The first match was played on 29 October 2010 and the final was on 10 December 2010 at SuperSport Park in Centurion. The trophy was won by the Knights after they defeated the Titans in the final.

The format of the group stage was changed this year, with the six franchises divided into two groups of three. Teams in the same group would play each other twice each (once at home and once away), and each of the teams in the other group only once. The top two teams in each group would progress to the semi-finals, which would be played over two (home and away) legs. New innovations were introduced to the playing conditions this year, including each team naming 13 players instead of 11. Teams could use 11 of these players during each innings. All of these changes were scrapped after a single season.

Group stage

Points table

Pool A

Pool B

Knockout stage

Semi-finals

1st Legs

2nd Legs

Final

Statistics

Most Runs

Source: Cricinfo

Most Wickets

Source: Cricinfo

External links
 Series home at ESPN Cricinfo

References 

South African domestic cricket competitions
MTN40